Ruslan Fomin (born 2 March 1986) is a Ukrainian retired footballer who played as a striker.

Career
He was loaned to Metalist Kharkiv in 2007. Fomin was also a member of the Ukraine national under-21 football team, as well as a former member of the under-18 and under-19 national football teams.

On 16 January 2015, Fomin signed a six-month contract with Azerbaijan Premier League side Gabala FK. Fomin left Gabala at the end of his contract.

He played for Apollon Smyrni in the Football League.

Career statistics

Club

Honours

Club

Shakhtar Donetsk
Ukrainian Premier League: (4) 2005–06, 2007–08, 2009–10, 2017–18
Ukrainian Cup:  2017–18

Illichivets Mariupol
Ukrainian First League:  2016–17

Ukraine under-21
 UEFA Under-21 Championship: runner-up 2006

References

External links
 
 

1986 births
Living people
Ukrainian people of Russian descent
Ukrainian footballers
Ukraine youth international footballers
Ukraine under-21 international footballers
Association football forwards
Ukrainian Premier League players
Ukrainian First League players
Ukrainian Second League players
Kazakhstan Premier League players
Football League (Greece) players
FC Arsenal Kharkiv players
FC Metalist Kharkiv players
FC Shakhtar Donetsk players
FC Mariupol players
FC Zorya Luhansk players
Gabala FC players
FC Atyrau players
Apollon Smyrnis F.C. players
Ukrainian expatriate footballers
Expatriate footballers in Azerbaijan
Expatriate footballers in Kazakhstan
Expatriate footballers in Greece
Ukrainian expatriate sportspeople in Azerbaijan
Ukrainian expatriate sportspeople in Kazakhstan
Ukrainian expatriate sportspeople in Greece
Sportspeople from Kharkiv Oblast